The Garland Hill Historic District is a national historic district located in Lynchburg, Virginia. The area is a small residential neighborhood incorporating the summit of one of the numerous hills surround downtown Lynchburg. The neighborhood was home to many of Lynchburg's oldest and most distinguished families, many of whom were associated with the tobacco industry.  Buildings in the district represent a variety of styles from the early 19th century through the early 20th century including the Gothic Revival, Victorian, and Queen Anne styles, some of which were designed by Lynchburg architects Edward Frye and Stanhope S. Johnson.

It was listed on the National Register of Historic Places in 1972.

Gallery

References

Historic districts in Lynchburg, Virginia
Gothic Revival architecture in Virginia
Victorian architecture in Virginia
Queen Anne architecture in Virginia
Buildings and structures in Lynchburg, Virginia
National Register of Historic Places in Lynchburg, Virginia
Historic districts on the National Register of Historic Places in Virginia